Elizabeth Bishop (born June 4, 1943) is an American politician who served in the Kansas House of Representatives from the 88th district from 2017 through 2021.

She resigned her seat to allow Democratic committeepersons from her district to choose her successor. On June 16, 2021, they picked Chuck Schmidt, a retired teacher, to succeed her.

References

External links
Vote Smart

1943 births
Living people
Democratic Party members of the Kansas House of Representatives
21st-century American women politicians
21st-century American politicians
Women state legislators in Kansas
Wichita State University alumni
People from Clintwood, Virginia